Adania Shibli is a Palestinian author and essayist. She was born in Palestine in 1974.

Personal life and education 

Shibli holds a Ph.D. from the University of East London in Media and Cultural Studies. Her dissertation is titled Visual Terror: A Study of the Visual Compositions of the 9/11 Attacks and Major Attacks in the 'War on Terror' by British and French Television Networks. She also completed a postdoctoral fellowship at the EUME c/o the Institute for Advanced Study in Berlin. Shibli has taught at the University of Nottingham, and since 2013, has worked as a part-time professor at the Department of Philosophy and Cultural Studies at Birzeit University, Palestine. 

Shibli and her children split their time between Jerusalem and Berlin. Shibli speaks Arabic, English, Hebrew, French, Korean, and German.

Writing career 
Since 1996, Shibli has published in literary magazines in Europe and the Middle East. Since then, she has expanded her work to include novels, plays, short stories, and narrative essays, published in numerous languages in anthologies, art books, and literary and cultural magazines.

Her non-fiction works include the art book Dispositions (Ramallah: Qattan), and a collected of essays called A Journey of Ideas Across: In Dialogue with Edward Said (Berlin: HKW). The collection of essays was turned into a symposium curated by Shibli in 2013, which took place at the House of World Cultures in Berlin. She invited artists and academics to reflect on the work and ideas of Edward W. Said, a theorist and critic known for his 1978 book Orientalism.

Works 
Minor Detail (تفصيل ثانوي), Fitzcarraldo Editions / New Directions, 2020, 
Keep your eye on the wall: Palestinian landscapes, Saqi Books, London, 2013, 
We are all equally far from love (Kulluna Ba’id bethat al Miqdar aan el-Hub) (كلنا بعيد بذات المقدار عن الحب), Clockroot Books, Northampton, MA, 2012, 
Touch (Masaas) (مساس), Clockroot Books, Northampton, MA, 2010,

Awards 
Shibli has received the Young Writer’s Award–Palestine by the A. M. Qattan Foundation for her novels Touch in 2001 and We are all equally far from love in 2003. She was named as one of the Beirut39, a group of 39 Arab writers under the age of 40 chosen through a contest organized by Banipal magazine and the Hay Festival. Minor Detail, translated by Elisabeth Jaquette, was shortlisted for the 2020 National Book Award for Translated Literature. In 2021, Minor Detail was also longlisted for the International Booker Prize.

References 

1974 births
Living people
21st-century Palestinian women writers
21st-century Palestinian writers
Palestinian novelists
Alumni of the University of East London